Pulleine is an English surname. Notable people with the surname include:

 Henry Pulleine (1838–1879), English army officer
 John Pulleine (1841–1913), English Anglican Bishop
 Robert Pulleine (1869–1935), physician and naturalist

English-language surnames